The Frank Anthony Memorial All-India Inter-School English Debate is held in the honor of Frank Anthony.

It is among the most prestigious inter-school, annual debate competition organised  by the Council for the Indian School Certificate Examinations (CICSE). Participants represent their schools and are divided into two groups (Category I for students of Standards XI and XII and Category II for students of Standards IX and X). Over 1,600 schools participate in the event each year.

The Debate competition is spread over three levels – Regional, Zonal and National Levels.

Each school sends two students from each group mentioned above. The topic is only revealed to the students an hour before the actual debate by way of opening a sealed envelope in their presence. This ensures that no pre-written material can be used in the debate. Students are expected to speak for a total time period of four minutes which is followed by two minutes of questioning and rebuttals. The students are allowed to and expected to refer to journals, magazines, and other books from the library during the one hour time to generate matter for their speaking time. No internet access or use of any electronic devices is allowed and referring to a written script during their speaking time is strictly discouraged.

The debate is only open to CISCE accredited schools.

Various years of debate

2009

Round 3 – National

Category 1

2010

Round 3 – National

Category 1

2011

Round 3 – National

Category 2

2012

Round 3 – National

Category 2

2013

Round 3 – National

Category 2 
{| class="wikitable" border="1"
! rowspan="2" | Date
! rowspan="2" | Host School
! rowspan="2" | Topic
! colspan="4" | Awards
|-
! Winner
! Best Speaker
! Runner-up speaker
! Second runner-up speaker
|-
| align="center" | 25 September 2013      ||The Frank Anthony Public School, Lajpat Nagar - IV, New Delhi         || Most of the problems of students today arise from their unrestricted freedom     || Jamnabai Narsee School, Mumbai   || Kanishk Mittal || Maahir Shah || '  |
|}

 Category 1 

 2014 

 Round 1 – Regional 

The first round of debate of the year 2014 was conducted in the following schools and zones with the topic mentioned accordingly.

 Round 2 – Zonal 

 Round 3 – National 

 2015 

 Round 1 – Regional 

 Round 2 – Zonal 
The Level I Debate was won by The Heritage School, Kolkata. Mohit Poddar, of The Heritage School, Kolkata was adjudged the Best Speaker in the Finals while Loyola School, Jamshedpur were the runners-up.
The 2015 level II debate was won by Aayush Rathod and Shrutika Mane of the Smt. Sulochanadevi Singhania School, Thane and was held in Dehradun. Loyola School, Jamshedpur was the 2nd Runners-Up in this category too.

 2016 
The first round of the debate in 2016 was on July 15.
The National Round was held on September 25. Loyola School, Jamshedpur was the only school to have qualified for both the category 1 and Category 2 of the debate.

The National Winners for Category 2 were Nitya K Nair and Megha N Nair from L'ecole Chempaka, Thiruvananthapuram, Kerala. The Best Speaker was Nitya K Nair. The national runners-up were Adarsh Sriram and Shivali Shah from Dhirubhai Ambani International School, Mumbai. 

 2018 

 Round 1 – Regional 

The first round of debate of the year 2018 was conducted in the following schools and zones with the topic mentioned accordingly.

 National Finals 2018 

With the Diamond Jubilee of the council, the Frank Anthony memorial all India inter school debate competition's National finals were hosted in the Frank Anthony Public school, Delhi. The seniors round saw schools from all across India. The topic was "Famous dropouts are the ones that contribute most to society".
The National champions were St. James' School Kolkata,  represented by Rustam Biswas and Souti Mukhopadhyay. Souti Mukhopadhyay also won the award for best speaker in the finals.

 2019 
 ROUND 1 – REGIONAL Category (II) – Class IX & X  Round 2 – Zonal'''

▼

Round 3 – National Finals 

The National Finals for the Frank Anthony memorial all India inter school debate were held in Kolkata on 25th September 2019. The senior round had schools from all across India, such as the Shriram Aravalli School, Delhi, and the Heritage school and defending champions St. James' School from Kolkata. The topic given was "The right to dissent is an integral part of any democracy". After a fiery round of debating, St. James' School was crowned National Champions for the second year running. The Heritage School was second runner up. The Best Speaker award went to Souti Mukhopadhyay, who is the only person to have won best speaker twice consecutively in the national finals of debate's long and prestigious history.

References

Asian debating competitions
Schools debating competitions